Dohazari Airfield is a former wartime United States Army Air Forces airfield near Dohazari in Bangladesh used during the Burma Campaign 1944-1945.  It is now abandoned.

History
Dohazari was used by the USAAF Tenth Air Force 1st Combat Cargo Group as a supply point for aerial resupply drops over Burma between 30  January and 15 May 1945.   The groups 2d and 4th Combat Cargo Squadron remained at the airfield flying C-46 Commando aircraft until 31 October when the base was closed after the war.

After the war the airfield was abandoned and today is part of an agricultural area.

References

 
  www.pacificwrecks.com - Dohazari  keyword search

Airfields of the United States Army Air Forces in British India
Defunct airports in Bangladesh
1945 in India
Airports established in 1944